The 2010 La Manga Cup was an exhibition international club football (soccer) competition featuring football club teams from Europe and North America, which was held in February 2010. All matches were played in La Manga Stadium in La Manga Club, Spain. This was the thirteenth La Manga Cup. The tournament was won by Molde, who beat FC Nordsjælland 2–1 in the final.

Teams 
The following eight clubs participated in the 2010 tournament:

 FC Midtjylland from the Danish Superliga in Denmark
 FC Nordsjælland from the Danish Superliga in Denmark
 SønderjyskE from the Danish Superliga in Denmark
 Seattle Sounders FC from Major League Soccer in the United States of America
 Molde from Tippeligaen in Norway
 Rosenborg from Tippeligaen in Norway
 Brann from Tippeligaen in Norway
 Stabæk from Tippeligaen in Norway

Matches
The following games are part of the tournament.

Quarterfinals

Semifinals Places 5-8

Semifinals Places 1-4

Seventh Place Match

Fifth Place Match

Third Place Match

Final

Final Placement

References

External links
History
Results

2010
2010 in Norwegian football
2010 in American soccer
2009–10 in Danish football
February 2010 sports events in Europe